The New Zealand National Bowls Championships is organised by Bowls New Zealand. Bowls was introduced in New Zealand in 1861 but the first National Championships were not held until 1914.

Men's singles champions

Men's pairs champions

Men's fours champions

Women's singles champions

Women's pairs champions

Women's fours champions

Mixed pairs (2-4-2) champions

References

Bowls competitions
Bowls in New Zealand